Attila Herédi (born 2 January 1959 ) is a former Hungarian professional footballer who played as a defender, later became a football coach. He was a member of the Hungarian national football team.

Career 
In 1972 he started playing football for Újpest FC. He made his debut in the top flight in 1979 and then spent a year on loan at Ganz-MÁVAG SE. Between 1979 and 1990 he played 221 league matches and scored 20 goals. With Újpest he was a one-time Hungarian champion and three-time Magyar Kupa winner. In 1990, he continued his career with Finnish club FC Haka.

National team 
Between 1985 and 1988 he played 4 times for the Hungarian national football team.

As a coach 
From 1997 to 2000 he was a coach at Újpesti TE, and from 2001 to 2002 at Fehérvár FC. From 2003 he coached Nyíregyháza Spartacus FC for one year. From 2008 he was again the coach of Újpesti TE, then he coached at Vecsési FC (2009-2010) and FC Tatabánya (2010-2011). From 2011 he coached at Pápai FC, and from 2013 he coached Jászapáti VSE and Vác U21. Since 2015, he has coached Maglódi TC.

Honours 

 Nemzeti Bajnokság I (NB I)
 Champion: 1989-90
 Magyar Kupa (MNK)
 Winner: 1982, 1983, 1987
 UEFA Europe League
 Quarter-finalist: 1983-1984
 Individual
 Hungarian Player of the Year: 1987

References 

Hungarian footballers
1959 births
Living people
Hungary international footballers
Association football defenders
Hungarian football managers
Újpest FC players
FC Haka players
Fehérvár FC managers
Nyíregyháza Spartacus FC managers
Vecsési FC managers
FC Tatabánya managers
Nemzeti Bajnokság I players